Biochemical engineering, also known as bioprocess engineering, is a field of study with roots stemming from chemical engineering and biological engineering. It mainly deals with the design, construction, and advancement of unit processes that involve biological organisms (such as fermentation) or organic molecules (often enzymes) and has various applications in areas of interest such as biofuels, food, pharmaceuticals, biotechnology, and water treatment processes. The role of a biochemical engineer is to take findings developed by biologists and chemists in a laboratory and translate that to a large-scale manufacturing process.

History 

For hundreds of years, humans have made use of the chemical reactions of biological organisms in order to create goods. In the mid-1800s, Louis Pasteur was one of the first people to look into the role of these organisms when he researched fermentation. His work also contributed to the use of pasteurization, which is still used to this day. By the early 1900s, the use of microorganisms had expanded, and was used to make industrial products. Up to this point, biochemical engineering hadn't developed as a field yet. It wasn't until 1928 when Alexander Fleming discovered penicillin that the field of biochemical engineering was established. After this discovery, samples were gathered from around the world in order to continue research into the characteristics of microbes from places such as soils, gardens, forests, rivers, and streams. Today, biochemical engineers can be found working in a variety of industries, from food to pharmaceuticals. This is due to the increasing need for efficiency and production which requires knowledge of how biological systems and chemical reactions interact with each other and how they can be used to meet these needs.

Education 
Biochemical engineering is not a major offered by most universities and is instead an area of interest under the chemical engineering major in most cases. The following universities are known to offer degrees in biochemical engineering:

 Brown University - Providence, RI
 Christian Brothers University - Memphis, TN
 Colorado School of Mines - Golden, CO
 Rowan University - Glassboro, NJ
 University of Colorado Boulder - Boulder, CO
 University of Georgia - Athens, GA
 University of California, Davis - Davis, CA
 University College London- London, United Kingdom
 University of Southern California - Los Angeles, CA
 University of Western Ontario - Ontario, Canada
 Indian Institute of Technology (BHU) Varanasi - Varanasi, UP
 Indian Institute of Technology Delhi - Delhi
 Institute of Technology Tijuana - México

Applications

Biotechnology 
Biotechnology and biochemical engineering are closely related to each other as biochemical engineering can be considered a sub-branch of biotechnology. One of the primary focuses of biotechnology is in the medical field, where biochemical engineers work to design pharmaceuticals, artificial organs, biomedical devices, chemical sensors, and drug delivery systems. Biochemical engineers use their knowledge of chemical processes in biological systems in order to create tangible products that improve people's health. Specific areas of studies include metabolic, enzyme, and tissue engineering. The study of cell cultures is widely used in biochemical engineering and biotechnology due to its many applications in developing natural fuels, improving the efficiency in producing drugs and pharmaceutical processes, and also creating cures for disease. Other medical applications of biochemical engineering within biotechnology are genetics testing and pharmacogenomics.

Food Industry 
Biochemical engineers primarily focus on designing systems that will improve the production, processing, packaging, storage, and distribution of food. Some commonly processed foods include wheat, fruits, and milk which undergo processes such as milling, dehydration, and pasteurization in order to become products that can be sold. There are three levels of food processing: primary, secondary, and tertiary. Primary food processing involves turning agricultural products into other products that can be turned into food, secondary food processing is the making of food from readily available ingredients, and tertiary food processing is commercial production of ready-to eat or heat-and-serve foods. Drying, pickling, salting, and fermenting foods were some of the oldest food processing techniques used to preserve food by preventing yeasts, molds, and bacteria to cause spoiling. Methods for preserving food have evolved to meet current standards of food safety but still use the same processes as the past. Biochemical engineers also work to improve the nutritional value of food products, such as in golden rice, which was developed to prevent vitamin A deficiency in certain areas where this was an issue. Efforts to advance preserving technologies can also ensure lasting retention of nutrients as foods are stored. Packaging plays a key role in preserving as well as ensuring the safety of the food by protecting the product from contamination, physical damage, and tampering. Packaging can also make it easier to transport and serve food. A common job for biochemical engineers working in the food industry is to design ways to perform all these processes on a large scale in order to meet the demands of the population. Responsibilities for this career path include designing and performing experiments, optimizing processes, consulting with groups to develop new technologies, and preparing project plans for equipment and facilities.

See also

Biofuel from algae
Biological hydrogen production (algae)
Bioprocess engineering 
Bioreactor landfill
Electrochemical energy conversion
Industrial biotechnology
Moss bioreactor
Photobioreactor

References